Nikolayevka is a rural locality (a khutor) in Bolshevistskoye Rural Settlement, Yelansky District, Volgograd Oblast, Russia. The population was 220 as of 2010.

Geography 
Nikolayevka is located on Khopyorsko-Buzulukskaya Plain, on the left bank of the Buzuluk River, 62 km south of Yelan (the district's administrative centre) by road. Bolshevik is the nearest rural locality.

References 

Rural localities in Yelansky District